Hell's Backbone Road is a 38-mile (61 km) gravel road that was built by the Civilian Conservation Corps in the 1930s, and connects the towns of Boulder, Utah and Escalante, Utah. A  drop is on either side. Near the bridge are views of the Box-Death Hollow Wilderness. From late spring to autumn, the road, which climbs to more than 9,000 feet (2,750 m) elevation, is passable by ordinary passenger vehicles, but it is very narrow and winding.

Hell's Backbone Road is a high-country alternative to the paved Utah Scenic Byway 12, which also connects Boulder and Escalante, 27 road miles (44 km) apart.

Images

References

Roads in Utah
Civilian Conservation Corps in Utah
Gravel roads